Christmas week blizzard may refer to:

 December 2010 North American blizzard
 Late December 2012 North American storm complex
 December 2022 North American winter storm